"Modern Soul" is a song by English singer James Blake. It was released on 11 February 2016 as the first track from his album The Colour in Anything (2016).

Release
Blake premiered "Modern Soul" in February 2016 during his BBC Radio 1 residency.

Track listing

References

2016 songs
2016 singles
James Blake (musician) songs
Songs written by James Blake (musician)
Song recordings produced by Rick Rubin
Polydor Records singles